Brian Adams (born December 27, 1969 in Mount Clemens, Michigan) is a member of the South Carolina Senate. He represents District 44.

References

1969 births
Living people
Republican Party South Carolina state senators
21st-century American politicians
People from Mount Clemens, Michigan